Jeonju Station is a railway station of Jeolla Line, located in Deokjin-gu, Jeonju, South Korea. KTX, ITX-Saemaeul, Mugunghwa-ho, S-Train stops at this station. Jeonju Station's feature is station built as Hanok style.

Timeline

Platform 
Station have 3 platforms, 5 tracks, operating as binary side platform.

Gallery

References

Railway stations in North Jeolla Province
Buildings and structures in Jeonju
Railway stations opened in 1914
Korea Train Express stations